Digital Pictures was an American video game developer founded in 1991 by Lode Coen, Mark Klein, Ken Melville, Anne Flaut-Reed, Kevin Welsh and Tom Zito.

The company originated from an attempt to produce a game for the failed VHS-based NEMO game system. One of its first titles, Night Trap, was originally produced as a title for the NEMO, before being converted for use with Sega's new Sega CD. The mature-themed content of Night Trap made it the source of some controversy. Nevertheless, the title was a bestseller. Digital Pictures went on to create other full motion video-based titles primarily for Sega hardware, and are regarded as a pioneer of the interactive movie genre. The company declined in the mid-1990s due to waning interest in full motion video games. Its final title, Maximum Surge, went unreleased and was later repurposed into a film called Game Over.

Full motion video games 
The founders of Digital Pictures met in the late 1980s while working at a division of the toy manufacturer Hasbro originally called Hasbro Interactive and later renamed Isix. The Isix team developed a video game system called NEMO (a code name abbreviation for "never ever mention outside") that used VHS tapes rather than cartridges, which allowed games to offer live action and interactive full motion video. They also developed a software prototype called Scene Of The Crime, which led to the production of two full-length titles, Night Trap and Sewer Shark.

After Hasbro executives declined to bring the NEMO system to market, closing its Isix division, key members of the Isix team founded Digital Pictures in 1991 and purchased the NEMO software assets from Hasbro. Digital Pictures converted Night Trap and Sewer Shark from their video-tape-based format to the Sega CD platform.

Throughout the 1990s, Digital Pictures continued to design interactive full motion video games for the CD-ROM format. Steve Russell worked for the company for a time. Several celebrities, including actors Steve Eastin, Corey Haim, Debbie Harry, Yasmine Bleeth, R. Lee Ermey, and Dana Plato; sports stars Scottie Pippen and Mike Ditka; and musical acts INXS, Kris Kross, C+C Music Factory, and Marky Mark and the Funky Bunch, appeared in Digital Pictures games.

Controversy 
In the early 1990s, Night Trap was singled out by numerous interest groups and by U.S. senators Joseph Lieberman and Herbert Kohl as evidence that the video game industry was marketing games with graphic violence and other adult content to minors. Concern about Night Trap and several other games such as Mortal Kombat helped to bring about the creation of the Entertainment Software Rating Board video game rating system.

Decline 
By the late 1990s, consumer interest in full-motion video games, which accounted for the majority of the company's profits, was in decline. After the collapse of the company, its assets were acquired by Cyber Cinema Interactive. The new company intended to re-release the games for DVD but that never came about. The only actual production for Cyber Cinema was the direct to video film Game Over – also known as Maximum Surge Movie. It used footage from an unreleased video game called Maximum Surge as well as clips from other Digital Pictures games. Although the film boasted stars such as Yasmine Bleeth and Walter Koenig, they only appear in the segments that had been pulled from the FMV sequences of the game, which suffer from lower image quality than the original footage.

Re-releases
Flash Film Works later acquired the rights to some of the games. They remastered and re-released Double Switch and Quarterback Attack for iTunes and Google Play in late 2016 before partnering with Screaming Villains and Limited Run Games to release PlayStation 4 remasters starting in 2018 with Double Switch and 2019 with Corpse Killer. Screaming Villains separately re-released Night Trap and Ground Zero Texas (two of the games not owned by Flash Film Works) through Limited Run Games.

Games developed 
List of games developed by Digital Pictures and all subsequent releases of the games either by them or successor companies.

References

External links 
 Digital Pictures at MobyGames
 History of Digital Pictures at Sega-16

 
Companies based in San Mateo, California
Defunct companies based in the San Francisco Bay Area
Video game development companies
Video game companies established in 1991
Video game companies disestablished in 1996
Defunct video game companies of the United States
1991 establishments in California
1996 disestablishments in California